Chocalho is the generic name for "shaker" in Portuguese. There are various types of idiophones using this name in Portuguese, not always being the same instrument:
a shaker;
a kind of jingle stick used to play samba music;
a cowbell;

Chocalhos are typically used as a support to the sound of the pineapple caixas, to sustain the rhythm in the bateria. This instrument consists of an aluminum or wooden frame with a number of rows, each carrying pairs of jingles (platinelas). The chocalho is played by shaking it back and forth and pumping the arms up and down.
Also known as Rocar.

Idiophones
Brazilian musical instruments